The 1962 UMass Redmen football team represented the University of Massachusetts Amherst in the 1962 NCAA College Division football season as a member of the Yankee Conference. The team was coached by Vic Fusia and played its home games at Alumni Field in Amherst, Massachusetts. UMass finished the season with a record of 6–3 overall and 4–1 in conference play.

Schedule

References

UMass
UMass Minutemen football seasons
UMass Redmen football